The Paris–Bordeaux–Paris Trail race of June 1895 is sometimes called the "first motor race", although it did not fit modern competition where the fastest is the winner. It was a win for Émile Levassor, who came first after completing the 1,178km race in 48 hours, almost six hours before second place. However, the official winner was Paul Koechlin, who finished third in his Peugeot, exactly 11 hours slower than Levassor, but the official race regulations had been established for four-seater cars, while Levassor and runner-up Louis Rigoulot were driving two-seater cars.

First race

Paris–Bordeaux–Paris is sometimes called the first motorcar race in history or the "first motor race". The 1894 Paris–Rouen had been run over public roads as a contest (concours) not a race, and the fastest finisher, a steam-powered vehicle, was judged ineligible for the main prize. Émile Levassor finished first in the 1,178 km Paris–Bordeaux–Paris race, taking 48 hours and 48 minutes, nearly six hours before the runner-up Louis Rigoulot, and eleven hours before the official winner, Paul Koechlin in his Peugeot. Officially, the race was for four-seater cars, and Levassor and Rigoulot drove two-seater cars. The ensuing outcry caused the A.C.F. to organise their next event, the 1896 Paris–Marseille–Paris, so that the fastest finisher was the winner.

Name
The race is sometimes referred to as the I Grand Prix de l'A.C.F. This results from a retrospective political move that began in the early 1920s when French media represented many races held in France before the 1906 French Grand Prix as being Grands Prix de l'Automobile Club de France, despite their running pre-dating the formation of the Club. Hence, the 1906 race was said to have been the 9th edition of the Grand Prix de l'Automobile Club de France. The ACF itself adopted this reasoning in 1933, although some members of the Club dismissed it, "concerned the name of the Club was lent to the fiction simply out of a childish desire to establish their Grand Prix as the oldest race in the world".

Levassor's progress
Levassor, who drove one of his cars, a 1205 cc (74 ci) Panhard & Levassor, started carefully, observing his opponents; he overtook the then leading Marquis de Dion who stopped to take on water for his steam car. Levassor led the race since then, stopping regularly to check his car's components. He came to Bordeaux several hours before any driver was expected to come which resulted in the fact that he had to drive back to Paris as well (the driver who was his change was still asleep in a hotel, and no one knew which one). Levassor accepted the situation calmly, waking the organisers up to prove his coming and his time, had some sandwiches and champagne, took a brief walk and set off for Paris at 2:30 am. When Baron René de Knyff met him en-route, he was so surprised by Levassor's time that he nearly crashed. Levassor, after spending two days and nights behind the wheel, triumphantly reached Paris, achieving an average speed of 24.5 km/h. He said after the race: "Some 50 km before Paris I had a rather luxurious snack in a restaurant which helped me. But I feel a little tired."

Legacy
The race proved that both the drivers and the cars were capable of such distances and it generated public enthusiasm which indicated that such events were commercially viable.

Results

Overall
The overall results were:

Did not finish
Entrants who did not finish:

Entrants
Entrants in order of departure:

See also

 Motorsport before 1906
 Paris–Rouen, 1894
 1896 Paris–Marseille–Paris

References

Other sources
 Gallica, Online Archive, Le Petit Journal Index
 Gallica, Online Archive, Le Petit Journal  9 June 1895 – Voitures sans chevaux – Changed route
 Gallica, Online Archive, Le Petit Journal  11 June 1895 – Voitures sans chevaux – Race day
 Gallica, Online Archive, Le Petit Journal  12 June 1895 – Voitures sans chevaux – Intermediate race report
 Gallica, Online Archive, Le Petit Journal  13 June 1895 – Voitures sans chevaux – Race report
 Gallica, Online Archive, Le Petit Journal  14 June 1895 – Voitures sans chevaux – Arrival in Paris
 Gallica, Online Archive, Le Petit Journal  15 June 1895 – Voitures sans chevaux – later finishers

External links

 Racing Database
 Paris–Bordeaux–Paris, in French
 Early auto racing, in Spanish
 Historic cars
 City to City Motor Races

Auto races in France
Defunct auto racing series
1895 in French motorsport
1895 establishments in France
History of Paris
Sports competitions in Paris
Sport in Bordeaux
June 1895 sports events

de:Motorsportjahr 1895
it:Storia dell'automobilismo (1895)
nl:Grand-prixseizoen 1895